Dexopollenia bicolor is a species of cluster fly in the family Polleniidae.

Distribution
Malaysia, Thailand.

References

Polleniidae
Insects described in 1935
Taxa named by John Russell Malloch
Diptera of Asia